Tarek Aziz Benaissa (born 7 April 1991) is a lightweight Greco-Roman wrestler from Algeria who competed at the 2012 and 2016 Olympics. In 2012 he received a bye for the preliminary round of sixteen, before losing out to Zaur Kuramagomedov, who scored one point each in two straight periods, leaving Benaissa without a single point. At the 2016 Rio Olympics Benaissa was eliminated in quarterfinals. At the 2015 World Wrestling Championships he lost a bronze medal match to Davor Štefanek.

Major results

References

External links
 

1991 births
Living people
Algerian male sport wrestlers
Olympic wrestlers of Algeria
Wrestlers at the 2012 Summer Olympics
People from Bordj Bou Arréridj
Wrestlers at the 2016 Summer Olympics
African Games gold medalists for Algeria
African Games medalists in wrestling
Competitors at the 2015 African Games
Competitors at the 2013 Mediterranean Games
Mediterranean Games competitors for Algeria
African Wrestling Championships medalists
21st-century Algerian people
20th-century Algerian people